Pascal Guyon is a French musician, producer, songwriter and mixing engineer  who contributed to three Grammy nominations. Guyon is also a coder and public speaker.

Life and career
Guyon started his professional career as a mixing engineer at seventeen years old. He became a classical and jazz piano teacher by nineteen, teaching at two french conservatories while performing with various bands. Pascal started collaborating with international artists such as Timbaland's artist D.O.E. and K-pop boy band TVXQ in 2008.

Guyon worked on "Spirit" by Leona Lewis and “The Point of It All” by Anthony Hamilton within his first two weeks in Los Angeles. He has been making music for elite artists and brands all over the world : Raheem DeVaughn, Rostrum Records, Wynter Gordon, Jane Zhang, Kim Tae-yeon, Hyperloop Transportation Technologies.

In 2015, Guyon was a member of the judging panel for Music Tech Fest's hackathon in Scandinavia along with Owsla artist Phonat. Pascal occasionally writes songs with Forbes 30 Under 30 Nanxi Liu, co-founder and CEO of Enplug.

In 2017, Guyon programmed a "proof of concept" educational video game allowing instant monetization at no cost to the player by leveraging blockchain technology.

In 2020, Guyon was a featured speaker at Campus Digital organised by Le Barreau De Paris, an event about the future of the music industry, law and technology.

Pascal has been collaborating with Hyperloop Transportation Technologies as a software developer.

Selected music credits
2020 "How Can I Fail" by NoTrace, featured in the NBA 2K21 video game
2020 "Fighter's Spirit" by NoTrace, featured in the NBA 2K21 video game
2020 "Making a Monster Out Of Me" by Katherine McNamara featured in the TV show The Stand (2020 miniseries) on CBS All Access
2017 "Rescue Me" by Kim Tae-yeon
2014 "Vadonatúj érzés" by Gigi Radics
2014 "Get Out Of My Life" by Jane Zhang
2011 "Putting it Out There" by Wynter Gordon
2011 "Blow Your Speakers" by Big Time Rush
2010 "BEAutiful" by Steph Jones
2009 "Why I like you" & "Love Disease" by Super Junior
2009 "Turn It Out" by D.O.E., The Marc Pease Experience
2008 "You're my melody" by TVXQ, album Mirotic
2008 "She's Gone" by Anthony Hamilton
2007 "Here I Am" by Leona Lewis

References

External links

French songwriters
Male songwriters
French record producers
Living people
Year of birth missing (living people)